Isaac Bustos (born February 16, 1975) is a Mexican former professional boxer who competed from 1995 to 2009. He held the WBC mini flyweight title from 2004 to 2005.

Professional career
Isaac won his first NABF Championship by beating veteran Jesus Vargas.

WBC Minimumweight Championship
Bustos won the WBC Minimumweight Championship by upsetting an undefeated Eagle Den Junlaphan by T.K.O. in the fourth round. He lost his title to Katsunari Takayama in his first defence by unanimous decision. In his next fight he would also lose a unanimous decision to WBO Minimumweight Champion Iván Calderón

Professional boxing record

See also
List of WBC world champions
List of Mexican boxing world champions

References

External links

Boxers from Mexico City
World Boxing Council champions
Mini-flyweight boxers
World mini-flyweight boxing champions
1975 births
Living people
Mexican male boxers